Pouce Coupe may refer to a number of places named for  a Beaver Indian Chief called Pouscapee:

Pouce Coupe, a village in British Columbia, Canada
Pouce Coupe River, a river in Alberta and British Columbia, Canada
Pouce Coupe Prairie, the southern part of Peace River Country in Alberta and British Columbia, Canada